Ali Asllani (28 November 1884 in Vajza, Vlorë District,  20 December 1966 in Tirana, Albania) was an Albanian poet, politician and activist of the Albanian National Awakening.

Biography
Asllani was born in village Vajza, Vlorë District, Ottoman Albania, in present-day Kotë, Selenicë municipality. He was educated in Ioannina (Zosimaia School) and Istanbul and started working as public servant in the Ottoman administration. He is  remembered for his song Hanko Halla. He collaborated with Ismail Qemali and his Provisional Government. In 1930s he represented Albania as consul in Greece and Bulgaria.

Selected works
 Hanko Halla: poemë, Biblioteka e Traditës: Antikuar, "Naim Frashëri", 1999

References

1884 births
1966 deaths
People from Selenicë
Albanians from the Ottoman Empire
Civil servants from the Ottoman Empire
20th-century Albanian politicians
19th-century Albanian writers
20th-century Albanian writers
Activists of the Albanian National Awakening
Zosimaia School alumni
Mekteb-i Mülkiye alumni
Ambassadors of Albania to Greece
Ambassadors of Albania to Bulgaria